Justifide is an American rock band from Chandler, Arizona, founded in 1999. The band consists of Jason Moncivaiz (vocals, drums), Sambo Moncivaiz (bass), and Joey Avalos (guitar). The band has seen success in Christian rock circles, and they have released two albums: Life Outside The Toy Box (2001) and The Beauty of the Unknown (2002). 

On December 11, 2014, Justifide announced a reunion and a new album, The Vault Sessions, which is scheduled to release in summer 2015.

History
The history of Justifide began at home with the brokenness of distressed family relations, and that eventually led to experiments with alcohol and other drugs.  While they were only in their teens, the Moncivaiz brothers lived in a house that was stressed to the breaking point, with the parents separated.  This started to spiral downward, and would have ended up much worse.  Fortunately, convinced of the family's need for God, the Moncivaiz father became born again.  This changed lives of those in the family.  Music was a natural outlet for the family, as both brothers started learning instruments at a young age.

Justifide started with Ian Metzger as the vocalist, Jason Moncivaiz on drums, Sambo Moncivaiz on the bass, Joey Avalos playing the guitar.  Their songs are not of overly depressive nor over-joyous tone. In the words of singer Jason Moncivaiz:

After about a year of touring and recording their first EP,  Ian Metzger left the band.  Jason started singing as well as playing the drums.  They toured a bit as a three piece band, but eventually started hiring drummers to free up Jason for vocals.  Some of the drummers they worked with were Jaren Johnston of The Cadillac Three, Jeff Irizarry of Dear Ephesus and Micah Schweinsberg of The Crabb Family and Crabb Revival.

After Joey Avalos left Justifide in 2003, Jason and Sambo formed a new band, Reform the Resistance. The band has maintained the nu metal/rapcore sound.

In 2014 they have released an EP

Awards and Rankings
Christian Rock Radio
-#1 “Pointing Fingers” (The Beauty Of The Unknown)
-#1 “To Live” (The Beauty Of The Unknown)
-#2 “The Way” (Life Outside The Toybox)
-#3 “9 Out of 10” (Life Outside The Toybox)
-#4 “Our Little Secret” (Life Outside The Toybox)

Awards and Accolades
-2001 Dove Nominations – Hard Music Recorded Song (“9 Out of 10”), Hard Music Album (Life Outside The Toybox)
-2001 R&R Top Christian Rock Impact Artists of 2001

Members
Last Known Lineup
Jason Moncivaiz - Drums, Vocals (Reform the Resistance)
Sambo Moncivaiz - Bass (Reform the Resistance)

Former
Ian Metzger - Vocals (1999-2000)
Joey Avalos - Guitar (1999-2003)

Former touring musicians
Jeff Irizarry - Drums (Dear Ephesus)
Jaren Johnston - Drums (The Cadillac Three)
Joel Stumbaugh - Drums
Micah Schweinsburg - Drums (The Crabb Family, Crabb Revival)
Victor Campos- Guitars
(Digital_e)

Discography

References

External links

Christian rock groups from Arizona
Musical groups established in 1999
Musical groups disestablished in 2003
American Christian metal musical groups
1999 establishments in Arizona
Rapcore groups
American nu metal musical groups
Heavy metal musical groups from Arizona
American hard rock musical groups